Irene Latham is an American author who writes books for children. Latham traveled worldwide with her family before settling in Alabama, in 1984. She is a graduate of Hewitt-Trussville High School and earned degrees in social work from the University of Alabama at Birmingham and the University of Alabama, Tuscaloosa. She is represented by Stimola Literary Studio.

Bibliography

Novels

 Illustrated by Stephanie Graegin.
African Town

Picture books

 Illustrated by Thea Baker

References

External links

1971 births
Living people
21st-century American novelists
American women novelists
Writers from Birmingham, Alabama
People from Covington, Georgia
University of Alabama alumni
University of Alabama at Birmingham alumni
Poets from Alabama
Poets from Georgia (U.S. state)
American women poets
21st-century American women writers
21st-century American poets
Novelists from Alabama
Novelists from Georgia (U.S. state)